Francis Gurdon (11 April 1861, Barnham Broom – 23 December 1929, York) was an Anglican bishop, the third Bishop of Hull in the modern era.

Life
Francis Gurdon was born on 11 April 1861, the third son of Rev. Edward Gurdon.

His two elder brothers, Edward Temple Gurdon and Charles Gurdon, were both early rugby union internationals, playing for England, and even more remarkably both went on to captain the national side. Like his brothers before him, he was educated at Haileybury and matriculated to Cambridge University. He was at Trinity College, in common with his eldest brother, Edward. His first post after ordination was as a curate in Isleworth. He held incumbencies at Limehouse, Lancaster Gate and Hessle before elevation to the episcopate as a suffragan to the Archbishop of York. He was appointed Bishop of Hull in September 1913.

He died in post on 23 December 1929.

Notes

1861 births
1929 deaths
People from Barnham Broom
People educated at Haileybury and Imperial Service College
Alumni of Trinity College, Cambridge
Bishops of Hull
20th-century Church of England bishops